This page lists the World Best Year Performance in the year 1998 in both the men's and the women's hammer throw. One of the main events during this season were the 1998 European Athletics Championships in Budapest, Hungary, where the final of the men's competition was held on August 19, 1998.

Men

Records

1998 World Year Ranking

Women

Records

1998 World Year Ranking

Notes

References
tilastopaja
apulanta
apulanta
digilander.libero
IAAF
hammerthrow.wz

1998
Hammer Throw Year Ranking, 1998